St. John the Evanglist, Carrington is a parish church in the Church of England in Carrington, Nottingham.

The church is Grade II listed by the Department for Digital, Culture, Media and Sport as it is a building of special architectural or historic interest.

History

It was first opened in 1843 to a design by William Surplice. The chancel was added in 1866 - 1877 by Jackson & Heazell. The north aisle was added in 1922.

When the spire of Holy Trinity Church, Trinity Square was removed by October 1942 stones from the spire were used in the new drive at St John's when the entrance from Mansfield Road was walled up and a new drive created from Church Drive. Other stones were incorporated into a wall on the Carrington Lido side of the churchyard.

Incumbents

 1843–1849: T. Bleaymire
 1849-1866: David Whalley (afterwards Rector of St. Peter's Church, Nottingham)
 1866-1877: J. G. Wright
 1877-1883: T. J. Rider
 1883-1905: W. R. Sparks
 1904-1909: Herbert Wild (later Bishop of Newcastle)
 1909-1917: Alfred Blunt (later Bishop of Bradford)
 1917-1947: C. Dudley Hart
 1947-1952: Ronald Sargison
 1952-1963: P. Black
 1963-1978: J. S. Wilkins
 1978-1987: G. Maltby
 1987-1995: Andrew Burnham (later Bishop of Ebbsfleet)
 1995-2001: J. Walker
 2002-2013: J. M. MacGillivray
 2014–2017: J. W. B. Tomlinson
 2018-2020 :James Pacey
 2022       Tracey Byrne

Organ
The organ was installed in 1949 and was obtained second hand from a private residence in Radcliffe on Trent. It had been built in 1936 by Roger Yates. The same builder rebuilt it in St. John's Church in 1949, and it was opened on 23 February 1949 by Harry Gabb, the sub-organist of St. Paul's Cathedral. A specification of the organ can be found on the National Pipe Organ Register.

Sources
The Buildings of England, Nottinghamshire, 1951, Nikolaus Pevsner

References

External links
Church of St. John the Evangelist, Carrington – official website
See St. John's Church on Google Maps

St John the Evangelist
Carrington, Church of St John the Evangelist
Churches completed in 1843
19th-century Church of England church buildings
Carrington, Church of St John the Evangelist
1843 establishments in England
Carrington